Alexander Freeman may refer to:

Alexander Freeman (footballer) (born 1970), Liberian footballer
Alexander Freeman (mathematician) (1838–1897), English astronomer and mathematician
Alexander Freiman (1879–1968), Polish-Soviet linguist
Alex Freeman (born 2004), American soccer player